Charles Davis Tull (born November 12, 1991) is a former American football linebacker. He was drafted by the New Orleans Saints in the fifth round of the 2015 NFL Draft. He played college football at University of Tennessee-Chattanooga.

College career
The Mocs were back to back Southern Conference champions from 2013–2014. Tull played defensive end and linebacker and started a school-record 48 straight games. As a  true freshman in 2011, he was voted to the conference All-freshman team as well as the College Sports Journal FCS freshman All-American team.

In his sophomore season, he recorded 12.5 sacks and 19 tackles for loss, breaking school single season records for both. He was voted a first-team all-American by Walter Camp and AFCA and multiple fan sites. He received second-team all-American recognition from the Sports Network and Associated Press. He was also voted Defensive player of the year for the conference by the coaches and media and won the school's male athlete of the year award.

Coming into his junior year Phil Steele ranked Tull as the number 1 defensive end and number 7 overall player in the nation for FCS. During the Mocs game against Furman that year Tull had 3.5 sacks and 2 FF and was named national defensive player of the week by the Sports Network. He led the UTC Mocs to a co-conference championship and after the season was voted a consensus first-team all-American by every major publication, making Tull the first consensus all American in school history. He broke the school's all-time sack record and was again voted the conference defensive player of the year by the league's coaches. He was awarded the elite defensive end award from the CPFA and also became UTC's first academic all-American in football by having above a 3.5 GPA in Exercise Science. He finished his junior season as a finalist for the Buch Buchanan award, given annually to the top defensive player in FCS. He is UTC's all-time sack, tackles for loss, and forced fumble leader.

Tull is the SoCon’s all-time sack leader with 37.0. He was named SoCon Defensive Player of the Year in 2012, 2013 and 2014, becoming the second player in SoCon history to be named defensive player of the year three times; the first was Appalachian State’s Dexter Coakley from 1994–96. He was named a finalist for the Buck Buchanan Award in both 2013 and 2014.

Professional career
Tull was invited to the east west shrine game and the NFL combine where he set the vertical jump record for his position. He was ranked number 7 out of 177 OLB by NFLdraftscout.com

New Orleans Saints
Tull was drafted in the fifth round of the 2015 NFL Draft by the New Orleans Saints, and was later signed to a 2.5 million dollar four-year contract and placed on the Saints 53 man roster. He was placed on the injured reserve early in the season.

On September 3, 2016, Tull was waived by the Saints.

Atlanta Falcons
On September 21, 2016, Tull was signed to the Falcons' practice squad. He was released on October 4, 2016 and re-signed on October 11. He was released on November 8, 2016.

Saskatchewan Roughriders
Tull signed with the Saskatchewan Roughriders on May 26, 2017. On July 4, 2017, the Roughriders released Tull.

Los Angeles Rams
On August 18, 2017, Tull signed with the Los Angeles Rams. He was waived on September 2, 2017.

Memphis Express
Tull signed with the Memphis Express of the Alliance of American Football in 2018 for the 2019 season.

Jacksonville Jaguars
On August 9, 2019, Tull was signed by the Jacksonville Jaguars. He was released with an injury settlement during final roster cuts on August 30, 2019.

Tull was drafted by the Houston Roughnecks in the 2020 XFL Draft, but did not sign with the league.

References

External links
Chattanooga Mocs football bio
Phil Steele 2013 Preseason FCS Top 100
https://web.archive.org/web/20140527220758/http://www.college-sports-journal.com/index.php/82-csj-releases/169-terrance-west-heads-up-first-csj-all-freshman-team
http://www.elonpendulum.com/2013/07/6-players-on-elons-schedule-who-have-a-shot-at-the-nfl/
https://web.archive.org/web/20150214105700/http://stats.ncaa.org/active_career_leaders/player_team_summary

1991 births
Living people
Chattanooga Mocs football players
Players of American football from Knoxville, Tennessee
American football linebackers
American football defensive ends
New Orleans Saints players
Atlanta Falcons players
Saskatchewan Roughriders players
Los Angeles Rams players
Memphis Express (American football) players
Jacksonville Jaguars players